Arthur Alan Neu (February 9, 1933 – January 2, 2015) was an American Republican politician and lawyer who served as the Lieutenant Governor of Iowa from 1973 to 1979.

Early life 
In 1933, Neu was born in Carroll, Iowa.

Education 
Neu received his bachelors and law degrees from Northwestern University. He was admitted to the Iowa bar and practiced law in Carroll.

Career 
Neu's career began as a lawyer in Carroll, Iowa. From 1967 to 1973, Neu served in the Iowa State Senate. Neu became a Lieutenant Governor of Iowa under Robert D. Ray. He was succeeded in 1979 by future Governor of Iowa Terry Branstad.
From 1982 to 1985, Neu served as the mayor of Carroll, Iowa.

Personal life 
Neu was married to Naomi Bedwell. Neu had 3 children.
On January 2, 2015, Neu died of pneumonia at a hospital in Des Moines, Iowa. He was 81.

References

1933 births
2015 deaths
People from Carroll, Iowa
Northwestern University alumni
Northwestern University Pritzker School of Law alumni
Iowa lawyers
Mayors of places in Iowa
Republican Party Iowa state senators
Lieutenant Governors of Iowa
20th-century American lawyers
20th-century American politicians